Shinee World 2013 (promoted as JAPAN ARENA TOUR SHINee WORLD 2013 ～Boys Meet U～) is the second Japan nationwide concert tour by South Korean boy group Shinee to promote their second Japanese studio album, Boys Meet U. The tour kicked off in Saitama on June 28, 2013, and ended in Nagoya on December 11, 2013, with a total of 15 concerts in nine cities. 

On October 30, 2013, EMI Records Japan announced Shinee would add two additional concerts on December 24 and 25, 2013, in Tokyo at Yoyogi National Gymnasium. This tour gathered over 220,000 fans. The video album for the tour was released on April 2, 2014.

History
Shinee performed their first set of concerts for Shinee World 2013 from June 28 to June 30, 2013. All in all, Shinee performed a total of 29 tracks, including their new promotional single "Breaking News", as well as their previous songs "Juliette", "Replay" and "Lucifer". They also revealed for the first time the Japanese version of "Dream Girl" and their new single "Boys Meet U", which was released on August 21, 2013.

Shinee completed their second Japanese arena tour in Tokyo. The finale performance took place between December 24 and 25, 2013, and gathered over 24,000 attendees in the Yoyogi National Gymnasium. The performance on December 24 was later released on DVD. The concert lasted for about two and a half hours and they performed a total of 30 songs, including tracks from their first and second Japanese albums, as well as their Japanese singles. Shinee also performed the Japanese version of "Everybody" for the first time. The group added:

Set list

Tour dates

References

External links
SM Entertainment - Official website
EMI Music Japan - Official website
Shinee - Official South Korean website
Shinee - Official Japanese website

Shinee concert tours
2013 concert tours